Theresa Carpinelli is the host of a Catholic radio show.

Radio show
Carpinelli hosts Truth Matters on the Living Bread Radio station based in Canton, Ohio.  The show covers topics such as Are you Saved?, Are We Assured Salvation?, and Infant Baptism from a Catholic perspective.

Wikipedia investigation
In early 2005, Carpinelli conducted a thorough investigation, including primary source materials obtained via inter-library loans and text materials into the source of allegations that in the aftermath of an earthquake in Lisbon, Portugal Catholic priests roamed city streets, hanging those they thought responsible for the quake. She summarized her findings in a four-part article published on Catholic website, concluding that Wikipedia was the likely source of the information which then spread to other information outlets.

In the first incarnation of the 1755 Lisbon earthquake article, written in 2003, appears the unsourced sentence

Priests of the inquisition roamed the city, rounding up "heretics" and hanging them on the spot for angering God

Other versions of the phrase appear elsewhere, such as

priests roved around the ruins, selecting at random those they believed guilty of heresy and thus to blame for annoying the Divine, who in turn had ordered up the disaster. The priests had them hanged on the spot.

The event is 
discussed at the Wikipedia Signpost.

References

See also
Talk:1755 Lisbon earthquake#Hanging priests allegation

Living people
American radio personalities
Year of birth missing (living people)